Nine News Melbourne is the weeknight, flagship news bulletin of the Nine Network in Australia, screened in Melbourne, Tasmania, and across Victoria.

Like all Nine News bulletins, the Melbourne bulletin runs for one hour, from 6pm every day. It comprises local, national and international news, as well as sport, weather and finance.

History 
The late Brian Naylor presented National Nine News Melbourne for 20 years from 1978 following his resignation from HSV-7 to 1998. Following his retirement, he was succeeded by Peter Hitchener as weeknight presenter, while Jo Hall took over from Hitchener as weekend presenter. Hall scaled back her work with Nine to news updates and fill-in duties in November 2011, with Weekend Today newsreader Alicia Loxley taking over as weekend presenter. Rob Gell formerly presented the weather until 2003, when he was replaced by Nixon; Gell subsequently defected to the rival Seven News Melbourne bulletin presenting the weather on weekends.

In March 2011, the GTV studios moved their base from Bendigo Street, Richmond, to a new building in Bourke Street, Docklands.

In May 2017, the station launched its first local afternoon news bulletin, Nine Afternoon News Melbourne, putting it head to head with its rival station Seven's local afternoon news. The bulletin is presented by Alicia Loxley (Monday-Wednesday) and Dougal Beatty (Thursday and Friday).

In December 2021, it was announced that Peter Hitchener would scale back to four days a week from January 2022 presenting from Monday to Thursday with Alicia Loxley presenting on Friday.

Ratings 
For many decades, Nine News Melbourne was the most dominant local news service, often drawing a peak audience of more than 400,000 viewers. However, in the mid-2000s, the bulletin started to lose ground to the rival Seven News Melbourne, winning only 24 (out of 40) weeks in 2006 and then narrowly losing in 2007 when it won 19 weeks (to Seven's 20 weeks, with the other week tied). Even during the years when Nine News struggled nationally, the Melbourne bulletin remained competitive, being the only metropolitan bulletin to win any weeks against Seven News in 2008 and 2009. By 2012, however, Nine News Melbourne had re-established its ratings dominance, often leading their rivals by an average margin of over 100,000 viewers.

Current presenters

Fill-in presenters 
 Alicia Loxley (news)
 Dougal Beatty (news)
 Alicia Muling (sport)
 Stephanie Anderson (weather)
 Justine Conway (weather)

Past presenters
 Sir Eric Pearce (1956–1978)
 Brian Naylor (1978–1998)

Reporters 
 Christine Ahern (Today Melbourne reporter)
 Seb Costello (A Current Affair reporter)
 Jo Hall
 Dougal Beatty
 Alexis Daish (A Current Affair reporter)
 Emily Rice (Health reporter)
 Madeline Spark
 Justine Conway
 Eliza Rugg
 Allan Raskall
 Neary Ty
 Chris Kohler
 Izabella Staskowski (Today Melbourne reporter)
 Adam Hegarty
 Reid Butler
 Brett McLeod (Europe correspondent)
 Elisabeth Moss
 Heidi Murphy
 Stephanie Anderson
 Mark Santomartino (State Political reporter)
 Lana Murphy
 Penelope Liersch

Sport 
 Braden Ingram
 Alicia Muling
 Joshua Dawe
 Natalie Yoannidis

References

External links
̣̼

Australian television news shows
Nine News
Black-and-white Australian television shows
Television shows set in Victoria (Australia)
1957 Australian television series debuts
1960s Australian television series
1970s Australian television series
1980s Australian television series
1990s Australian television series
2000s Australian television series
2010s Australian television series
Flagship evening news shows